Gustav Indrebø (17 December 1889 in Samnanger, Hordaland – 3 August 1942) was a Norwegian philologist.

His father was a teacher in Årdal, Jølster. His brother Ragnvald Indrebø became bishop of the diocese of Bjørgvin.

He graduated in 1917, took a doctorate (dr.philol.) in 1925, and became professor in linguistics in 1930. He published over 200 scholarly papers. Linguistically he was an advocate of the Aasen line of new Norwegian, and he was the chairman of Noregs Mållag from 1930 to 1932.

Interested in toponymy, Indrebø established Norsk Stadnamnarkiv in 1921 together with fellow professors Magnus Olsen and Edvard Bull, Sr.

References
Sogn og Fjordane county encyclopedia (Norwegian Broadcasting Corporation)

1889 births
1942 deaths
People from Samnanger
Noregs Mållag leaders
Norwegian philologists
Academic staff of the University of Bergen
Translators of the Bible into Norwegian
20th-century translators
20th-century philologists